Macandrewia is a genus of sea sponges, and is the only genus in the monotypic family Macandrewiidae.

Description 
Species are cup-shaped, expanded, more or less sinuate or lobed. They are attached to the substrate by a more solid base. They are covered by a fleshy layer. It is supported by a siliceous cup-shaped axis. The upper surface is covered in of pores, which are grouped into roses which are surrounded by radiating grooves. The lower surface is non-porous.

Species 
The following species are recognised:

 Macandrewia auris Lendenfeld, 1907
 Macandrewia azorica Gray, 1859
 Macandrewia clavatella (Schmidt, 1870)
 Macandrewia minima Carvalho & Xavier, 2020
 Macandrewia ramosa Topsent, 1904
 Macandrewia rigida Lévi & Lévi, 1989
 Macandrewia robusta Topsent, 1904
 Macandrewia schusterae Carvalho & Xavier, 2020
 Macandrewia spinifoliata Lévi & Lévi, 1983

References

Tetractinellida